Biteback Publishing is a British publisher based in London concentrating mainly on political titles. It was incorporated, as a private limited company with share capital, in 2009. It was jointly owned by its managing director Iain Dale and by Michael Ashcroft's Political Holdings Ltd, until 2018 when Iain Dale stepped down to focus on his TV and radio work. Biteback Publishing has published several of Ashcroft's books including Call Me Dave, his controversial 2015 biography of David Cameron.

Other titles include Out in the Army. My Life as a Gay Soldier (2013) by James Wharton, The Left's Jewish Problem (2016) by Dave Rich, and Post-Truth: How Bullshit Conquered the World (2017) by investigative journalist James Ball.

Around 20% of the company's sales are ebooks.

References

External links

Book publishing companies based in London
Publishing companies established in 2009
Political book publishing companies